The 1998 European Community Championships was a men's tennis tournament played on hard courts in Antwerp, Belgium, that was part of the Championship Series of the 1998 ATP Tour. It was the sixteenth edition of the tournament and was held 16–22 February 1998.

Seeds
Champion seeds are indicated in bold text while text in italics indicates the round in which those seeds were eliminated.

Draw

Finals

References

ECC Antwerp
Doubles